This is the list of theatrical feature films founded in 1937 owned by Sampaguita Pictures. It is also include some movies produced by their co-film companies like Vera-Perez Productions, VP Pictures or its combination of the two film company.

1930s

1937

1938

1939

1940s

1940

1941

1942

1946

1947

1948

1950s

1950

1951

1952

1953

1954

1955

1956

1957

1958

1959

1960s

1960

1961

1962

1963

1964

1966

1967

1968

1969

1970s

1970

1972

1973

1977

Produced by Vera-Perez Productions

Produced by VP (Vera-Perez) Pictures

Produced by Sampaguita-VP Pictures

Sampaguita Pictures

Footnotes

References

 Sampaguita Pictures films